Sylvia Jane Hutton (née Kirby, born December 9, 1956), also known mononymously as Sylvia, is an American country music and country pop singer and songwriter. Her biggest hit (a crossover chart topper), was her single "Nobody" in 1982. It reached number 15 on the Billboard Hot 100, number 5 on the Billboard Adult Contemporary chart, number 9 on the Cashbox Top 100, and number 1 on the Billboard Country Singles chart. The song earned her a gold record certification and a Grammy Award nomination for Best Female Country Vocal Performance. Her other country chart hits include "Drifter" (number one in 1981), "Fallin' in Love", "Tumbleweed" and "Snapshot". She was named Female Vocalist of the Year by the Academy of Country Music for 1982. She is also credited with making the first "concept" music video clip to air on Country Music Television (CMT), with "The Matador".

Early life
Sylvia was born in Kokomo, Indiana, United States. She began performing at age 3 when she was asked to sing at a small local church. Sylvia eventually relocated to Nashville, Tennessee, on December 26, 1976. Wishing to become a recording artist, Sylvia took a job as a secretary for producer and publisher Tom Collins, who produced records for both Barbara Mandrell and Ronnie Milsap.

Career 
After auditioning for Dave & Sugar, Sylvia was signed as a solo artist by RCA Records in 1979. Her first RCA single was called "You Don't Miss a Thing". The song reached the Country Top 40. In 1980 she released another single, "It Don't Hurt to Dream". The record rose a little higher, to number 35. That same year, she finally made it to the Top 10 with "Tumbleweed". In 1981, her song "Drifter" hit number 1 on the country charts, and two other songs, "The Matador" and "Heart on the Mend" landed in the Top 10. "The Matador" was country music's first conceptual music video to air on CMT. Drifter was her 1981 RCA debut studio album, containing the hits "Tumbleweed" and "Heart On The Mend".

Chart hits in the 1980s
In 1982, from her Just Sylvia studio album, Sylvia released the single "Nobody", which reached number 1 on the country music chart, hit number 15 on Billboards Hot 100 chart, and sold more than a million copies. The song was also an Adult Contemporary hit, making the Top 5. "Nobody" became Sylvia's signature song.

"Nobody" and the album Just Sylvia were certified gold in the United States and Canada. "Nobody" was the 1982 BMI Song of the Year, awarded for receiving more radio airplay than any other single that year. In 1982, Sylvia was the Academy of Country Music's "Female Vocalist of the Year" and a Grammy nominee for "Best Female Vocalist".

In 1983, Sylvia's album Snapshot was released; its title song climbed to number 5 on the country chart and became her second-highest selling single. She had two other songs in the Top 20 that year, "I Never Quite Got Back" and "The Boy Gets Around".

In 1985, Sylvia released One Step Closer, produced by Brent Maher, who brought a more guitar-driven feel. Three singles were released: "Fallin' in Love", "Cry Just a Little Bit", and "I Love You By Heart." This was followed up by Sylvia's last top 40 country hit, "Nothin' Ventured, Nothin' Gained", from the unreleased album Knockin Around. The shelving of this album marked the end of Sylvia's tenure with RCA Records. Sylvia recorded for RCA until the end of 1987, delivering 11 Top Ten songs, and selling more than four million records.

RCA put together a Greatest Hits compilation and issued a new single titled "Straight from My Heart", written with Jimmy Fortune of the Statler Brothers. With little promotion from RCA, the single charted in the low 60s.

Later career
When her contract with RCA ended, Sylvia took a break from touring and recording to focus on developing as a songwriter. In 1988 and 1989, she guest-hosted TNN's Crook and Chase show and her own Holiday Gourmet cooking special.

Sylvia's first independent album, The Real Story, was released in 1996 on her own label, Red Pony Records. In a May 1998 People magazine review, Ralph Novak wrote, "Sylvia always sang with more intensity and resonance than most country singers... and she can still sing a story song better than almost anyone around."

In 2002, she followed with Where in the World, a set that marked the culmination of an 11-year musical collaboration with John Mock. Songwriter Craig Bickhardt contributed the song "Crazy Nightingale". Bickhardt had previously performed with Sylvia from 1984, and wrote the title cut to One Step Closer. Also in 2002, Sylvia released, A Cradle in Bethlehem, her first Christmas album.

In 2016, the album, It's All in the Family, was released on Red Pony Records.

In 2018, Sylvia released, Second Bloom: The Hits Re-Imagined, an album of some of her hits she re-recorded with a more acoustic yet fully produced approach.

Sylvia's new album, Nature Child -- A Dreamer's Journey, is to be released on February 22, 2022.

Discography

Awards and honors

References

External links
 Sylvia page at CMT.com
 Sylvia's personal page
 Sylvia's music website

Bibliography
 Vladimir Bogdanov, Chris Woodstra & Stephen Thomas Erlewine (ed.) (2003) All Music Guide to Country, 2nd ed., p. 756,  .
 Richard Carlin (1995) The Big Book of Country Music, A Biographical Encyclopedia, p. 450,  .
 The Editors of Country Music (1994) The Comprehensive Country Music Encyclopedia, p. 380,  .
 Michael Erlewine with Vladimir Bogdanov, Chris Woodstra & Stephen Thomas Erlewine (ed.) (1997) All Music Guide to Country, 1st ed., p. 458,  .
 Brian Mansfield & Gary Graff (ed.) (1997) MusicHound Country: The Essential Album Guide, p. 427-8,  .
 Barry McCloud (1995) Definitive Country: The Ultimate Encyclopedia of Country Music and Its Performers, p. 791-2,  .
 Tad Richards & Melvin B. Shestack (1993) The New Country Music Encyclopedia, p. 219,  .
 Kurt Wolff (2000) Country Music: The Rough Guide, p. 454-5,  .

1956 births
Living people
American women country singers
American country singer-songwriters
People from Kokomo, Indiana
RCA Records Nashville artists
Country musicians from Indiana
21st-century American women singers
21st-century American singers
Singer-songwriters from Indiana